Georges Fouré (1848 in Paris-1902) was a 19th-century French-German philatelist and stamp forger.

Fouré lived in Berlin and was the editor of the Berliner Illustrierte Briefmarkenzeitung. As such he introduced his audience to remarkable "discoveries" of stamps of the German States that in reality he had created. He did not imitate known stamps, but like an artist, he created new ones. He took no one in confidence, never disclosed when, where, why or how he did his forgeries.

See also
List of stamp forgers

References and sources

 Gustac Schenk. The Romance of the Postage Stamp. Doubleday and Co, Garden City, NY (1959), p200ff.

External links
 Georges Fouré. Ein Meister seines Faches (German) retrieved 04-12-2008

1848 births
1902 deaths
19th-century French people
Stamp forgers
French philatelists
German philatelists
Philately of Germany